In Latin grammar, the subjunctive by attraction is a name given when the verb in a relative clause or a temporal clause which is closely dependent on a subjunctive verb becomes subjunctive itself. The name also applies to subjunctives used when a subordinate clause is "so closely connected with an infinitive as to form an integral part of" it.

Examples of subjunctive by attraction
The following sentences are cited in grammars of a verb in a subordinate clause which is made subjunctive because the main verb is subjunctive. In the first group, the affected verb is in a relative clause of a general type:
 (Cicero)
'who would love a man that he fears?'

 (Martial)
'that which you buy, you could rightly call your own'

 (Cicero)
'no (miser) has ever yet been found for whom what he had was enough'

 (Publilius Syrus)
'whatever you have done to another, you should expect from a third person'

In the second group, the affected verb is in a generalised temporal clause ('whenever...') or conditional clause ('if ever...'):
 (Nepos)
'thus it used to happen that whenever he went out in public, he made everyone's eyes turn to him'

 (Cicero)
'spiders weave a web so that, if anything gets caught in it, they can finish it off'

In the following case, both verbs depend on an initial verb of fearing:
 (Cicero)
'but I am afraid in case, while I am trying to lessen the difficulty, I might end up by increasing it'

In another group cited by grammars, the subordinate clause with a subjunctive verb depends on an infinitive: 
 (Cicero)
'an orator must be capable of speaking about any general subject that is put before him'

 (Quintilian)
'it is a sign of a lazy nature to be content with things which have been discovered by other people'

 (Cicero)
'it is a custom at Athens for those who have died in battles to be praised in the assembly'

 (Cicero)
'nor can goodness exist if it is not sought for its own sake'

However, the relative clauses in the first and second examples could also be seen as generic ('the sort of things which...').

A verb in a relative clause dependent on a subjunctive does not always become subjunctive. In the following examples, the underlined verbs are indicative, even though the writer is talking in general terms, not about a particular case:
 (Catullus)
'the thing which you see has perished, you should consider lost for ever'

 (Cicero)
'it is brought about by an orator that those who hear are affected as he wishes'

The subjunctive is even less likely to be used when the relative clause is referring to a particular group of individuals:
 (Caesar)
'he sent cavalrymen to pursue those who had fled'

According to Gildersleeve & Lodge (1895), the subjunctive by attraction has something in common with the subjunctive which is obligatory in dependent clauses in indirect speech, such as the following:
 (Cicero)
'Cato used to say that he was surprised that one soothsayer didn't laugh whenever he saw another'

 (Quintilian)
'the Greeks rightly teach that things which can't be accomplished shouldn't be attempted'

Accounting for the subjunctive by attraction
One authority, Hale, explains the usage as follows:

Bennett (1910) contests this reasoning:

Conditions under which attraction takes place

Frank's study (1904) shows:

 The attracted clause is preferably in the same time-sphere as the clause on which it depends.
 Its favorite position is between the introductory conjunction (when such exists) and the verb of the governing clause.
 Its verb rarely expresses precise modal and temporal force.
 The clause as a whole is rather of the generalizing than of the determinative type.
 It is more frequently a temporal than a relative clause.
 It is connected with the predicate more frequently than with the subject or object of the sentence.
 As a rule, it is an essential clause, and grammatically depends very closely upon the main body of the clause to which it is attracted.

These favoring conditions are met in only about 37% of all the clauses dependent upon subjunctives. When these favoring conditions do not exist, the dependent clause stands in the indicative, unless the clause would regularly stand in the subjunctive for some other reason (purpose, result, etc.).

References

Further reading
Bennett, Charles E. (1908) [1895]. A Latin Grammar.

Frank, Tenney Attraction of Mood in Early Latin, Chicago, 1904
Frank, "The Influence of the Infinitive upon Verbs Subordinated to It", Amer. Jour. Phil, xxv, p. 428 ff.
Gildersleeve, B.L. & Gonzales Lodge (1895). Gildersleeve's Latin Grammar, 3rd edition, pp. 363-4, 402-3.
Harkness, Alfred (1881) [1864].  A Latin Grammar for Schools and Colleges pp. 244-245. New York.
Pinkster, Harm (1990), Latin Syntax and Semantics.
Woodcock, E.C. (1959). A New Latin Syntax.

Latin grammar